Mikki Kendall (born October 23, 1976) is an author, activist, and cultural critic. Her work often focuses on current events, media representation, the politics of food, and the history of the feminist movement. Penguin Random House published her graphic novel Amazons, Abolitionists, and Activists in 2019, while her political nonfiction book Hood Feminism was released in early 2020.

Early life and education

Kendall was born in Chicago, Illinois on October 23, 1976 and was raised in the Hyde Park neighborhood of Chicago. Kendall is a 2005 graduate of the University of Illinois at Urbana Champaign. Kendall also has a Masters in Writing and Publishing from DePaul University.

Career

A veteran of the United States Army, Kendall worked in government service until 2013 when she left her job at the Department of Veterans Affairs to pursue her writing career full-time.

Kendall is currently an essayist and cultural critic. She has written for The Guardian, The Boston Globe, NBC News, The Washington Post, Bustle, Essence and Eater (with her essay in Eater "Hot Sauce in Her Bag" named a Best Food Essay by the Association of Food Journalists). She has appeared as a cultural commentator on NPR, Al Jazeera English, and the BBC.

She is recognizable as a member of Black Twitter. Kendall is also the creator of the viral Twitter hashtags #SolidarityIsForWhiteWomen, which criticized racism in the feminist movement, as well as #FastTailedGirls, a reference to the hypersexualization of Black girls, and #FoodGentrification, about the marginalization of traditional foods by commercial interest.

Kendall edited the science-fiction anthology Hidden Youth for Crossed Genres Press in 2016. Kendall's graphic novel history Amazons, Abolitionists, and Activists: A Graphic History of Women's Fight for Their Rights was released in November 2019 by Ten Speed Press and her political-nonfiction book Hood Feminism: Notes From the Women That a Movement Forgot was released in February 2020 by Viking Books. It criticizes the feminist movement for being largely "the province of the privileged" and ignoring problems that disproportionately impact communities of color, including poverty, housing, medical care, and racism.

Awards and honors  
2017: Best Food Essay Award from the Association of Food Journalists for "Hot Sauce in Her Bag: Southern Black identity, Beyoncé, Jim Crow, and the pleasure of well-seasoned food"

Bibliography

Books

Recent essays

References

External links

1976 births
Living people
21st-century American women writers
University of Illinois Urbana-Champaign alumni
DePaul University alumni
Writers from Chicago
21st-century African-American women writers
21st-century African-American writers
20th-century African-American people
20th-century African-American women